Ricardo Rojas (born 4 April 1959) is a Mexican archer. He competed in the men's individual and team events at the 1992 Summer Olympics.

References

1959 births
Living people
Mexican male archers
Olympic archers of Mexico
Archers at the 1992 Summer Olympics
Place of birth missing (living people)
Pan American Games medalists in archery
Pan American Games silver medalists for Mexico
Pan American Games bronze medalists for Mexico
Archers at the 1991 Pan American Games
Medalists at the 1991 Pan American Games
20th-century Mexican people